Afsou (Tarifit: Afsu, ⴰⴼⵙⵓ; Arabic: أفسو) is a commune in the Nador Province of the Oriental administrative region of Morocco. At the time of the 2004 census, the commune had a total population of 3413 people living in 493 households.

References

Populated places in Nador Province
Rural communes of Oriental (Morocco)